The Warren County Courthouse in Warrenton, Georgia, located on Courthouse Square, was built in 1909.  It is a Classical Revival-style building.  It was listed on the National Register of Historic Places in 1980.

It is a cross-plan red brick courthouse sitting on a "tiny" square.  It has a hipped roof with an octagonal dome topped by a cupola.

References

Courthouses in Georgia (U.S. state)
National Register of Historic Places in Georgia (U.S. state)
Neoclassical architecture in Georgia (U.S. state)
Government buildings completed in 1909
Warren County, Georgia
1909 establishments in Georgia (U.S. state)